The 1935 William & Mary Indians football team represented William & Mary during the 1935 college football season. The opener against the Virginia Cavaliers was the first-ever game played at William & Mary's brand new Cary Field. The game ended in a 0–0 tie.

Schedule

References

William and Mary
William & Mary Tribe football seasons
William and Mary Indians football